Gheorghe Váczi (4 August 1922 – 16 October 2006) was a Romanian football player who played as a striker.

Career overview 
Total matches played in Romanian First League: 194 matches – 126 goals
Total matches played in Hungarian First Division: 48 matches – 26 goals
Topscorer of Romanian First League: 1949 and 1951.
Winner of Liga I: 1949, 1954
Winner of Cupa României: 1953
Romania B: 3 matches – 1 goal

1 The 1955 Second League goals and appearances made for Progresul Oradea are unavailable.

External links

1922 births
2006 deaths
People from Mediaș
Romanian footballers
Romania international footballers
Romanian expatriate footballers
Liga I players
Liga II players
CA Oradea players
FC UTA Arad players
ACS Sticla Arieșul Turda players
CS Gaz Metan Mediaș players
FC Admira Wacker Mödling players
Association football forwards